The 1970–71 season was Paris Saint-Germain's 1st season in existence. PSG mainly played their home league games at the Stade Jean-Bouin in Paris, but occasionally at the Stade Municipal Georges Lefèvre in Saint-Germain-en-Laye as well, registering an average attendance of 3,018 spectators per match. The club was presided by Pierre-Étienne Guyot and the team was coached by player-manager Pierre Phelipon. Jean Djorkaeff was the team captain.

Summary

In the summer of 1970, an ambitious group of businessmen decided to create a major team in the French capital. Guy Crescent and Pierre-Étienne Guyot chose to merge their virtual side, Paris FC, created in 1969, with Stade Saint-Germain of Henri Patrelle after the team from Saint-Germain-en-Laye, 15km west of Paris and founded in 1904, won promotion to Division 2. However, the three men were stuck with the financial feasibility of the project until they met Real Madrid president Santiago Bernabéu. He told them that starting a crowdfunding campaign was the best solution to establish a new team.

20,000 people backed the project and Paris Saint-Germain were formed on June 17, 1970. Pierre-Étienne Guyot was elected the club's first president a few days later. For the first time in French football history, the fans had financially contributed in the making of a club. The merger was made official following the creation of the club's association on August 12, 1970. PSG retains this day as their foundation date. Red, blue and white were adopted as the club's traditional colours. The red and blue represent the city of Paris, while the white is a symbol of French royalty and stands for the nearby royal town of Saint-Germain-en-Laye, the birthplace of French King Louis XIV.

Paris FC contributed with the financial backing, while Stade Saint-Germain provided the sporting infrastructure, from the Division 2 status to the Camp des Loges training center, as well as the manager Pierre Phelipon and most of the players, including Bernard Guignedoux, Michel Prost and Camille Choquier. In addition to becoming PSG's first manager ever, Phelipon was also one of only two player-managers in the history of the club. PSG further strengthened their squad with the signing of Jean Djorkaeff, captain of the France national team. PSG's first official game was a 1–1 league draw away to Poitiers on August 23, 1970. Guignedoux scored the club's first ever goal from a free-kick. The club went on to clinch promotion to Division 1 and claim the Division 2 title in its inaugural season.

Players

As of the 1970–71 season.

Squad

Transfers

As of the 1970–71 season.

Arrivals

Kits

The club didn't have a shirt sponsor. French sportswear brand Le Coq Sportif was the kit manufacturer.

Friendly tournaments

Mini Tournoi de Lille

Competitions

Overview

Division 2

Regular season (Group Center)

Results by round

Championship play-offs

Matches

Coupe de France

Preliminary rounds

Round of 64

Statistics

As of the 1970–71 season.

Appearances and goals

|-
!colspan="16" style="background:#dcdcdc; text-align:center"|Goalkeepers

|-
!colspan="16" style="background:#dcdcdc; text-align:center"|Defenders

|-
!colspan="16" style="background:#dcdcdc; text-align:center"|Midfielders

|-
!colspan="16" style="background:#dcdcdc; text-align:center"|Forwards

|-

References

External links

Official websites
PSG.FR - Site officiel du Paris Saint-Germain
Paris Saint-Germain - Ligue 1 
Paris Saint-Germain - UEFA.com

Paris Saint-Germain F.C. seasons
French football clubs 1970–71 season